Justin Paul Tomlinson (born 5 November 1976) is a British politician and former marketing executive who served as Minister of State for Disabled People, Work and Health from 2019 to 2021. A member of the Conservative Party, he has been the Member of Parliament (MP) for North Swindon since 2010.

A former councillor on Swindon Borough Council, Tomlinson previously served as Parliamentary Private Secretary to Ed Vaizey. He served in Prime Minister David Cameron's government as Parliamentary Under-Secretary of State for Disabled People from 2015 to 2016. He was a junior minister during the second May ministry at the Department for Work and Pensions, as Parliamentary Under-Secretary for Family Support, Housing and Child Maintenance from 2018 to 2019.

Early life and career
Tomlinson was born in Blackburn, Lancashire on 5 November 1976. His mother Vera represents St. Andrews ward on Swindon Borough Council.  He studied at Harry Cheshire High School, a state comprehensive in Kidderminster, Worcestershire, and Oxford Brookes University, where he was Chairman of its Conservative Student Branch from 1995 to 1999. He was National Chairman of Conservative Future, the youth-wing of the Conservative Party, between 2002 and 2003.

Tomlinson worked as the manager of a nightclub called Eros in Swindon, and later owned a marketing business.

Tomlinson was elected as the Conservative Party candidate for Abbey Meads ward of Swindon Borough Council in 2000, then re-elected for the same ward in 2002 and 2006.

Parliamentary career
Tomlinson unsuccessfully stood in North Swindon at the 2005 general election, losing to the defending Labour MP Michael Wills by 2,571 votes. However, he won the seat from Labour at the 2010 election, defeating the new Labour candidate Victor Agarwall by 7,060 votes. In total, Tomlinson received 22,408 votes (44.6% of the vote), with a swing of 10.1% from Labour to the Conservatives.

Along with fellow Conservative MP Chris Kelly, Tomlinson placed a bet while at university that he would be Prime Minister before the year 2038. He stands to win £500,000 should this happen. Kelly stood down at the 2015 election after having served a single term.

He reported the Labour MP Sadiq Khan to the police in 2014 after Khan was photographed apparently driving whilst using a mobile phone. Tomlinson said "those who make the laws should certainly not be above them". Khan was not prosecuted and went on to become elected as Mayor of London in 2016. Also in 2016, Tomlinson was punished for contempt was when he was suspended for two days after leaking a draft committee report.

He was appointed Parliamentary Under Secretary of State for Disabled People following the 2015 General Election victory of the Conservative Party, serving until the new Prime Minister, Theresa May, reshuffled the government in 2016. Prior to that he was Parliamentary Private Secretary to Ed Vaizey. On 9 July 2018, Tomlinson was appointed as a junior minister in the Department for Work and Pensions as Parliamentary Under-Secretary for Family Support, Housing and Child Maintenance.

In May 2015, it was reported by The Huffington Post that his appointment as Minister for Disabled People was controversial as he had previously voted against protecting the benefits of disabled children and those undergoing cancer treatment.

Tomlinson faced calls for his resignation in October 2015 after it was reported that he had leaked information from the Public Accounts committee regarding regulation of short term high cost credit "payday lenders" to Wonga.com back in 2013. Tomlinson accepted he had broken the rules and apologised, stating that his "strongly-held belief that action needed to be taken on payday lenders" had caused his "judgement to be clouded". Tomlinson arranged £30,000 of sponsorship for Swindon Supermarine F.C., a local football team by the same payday lender. The football club's chairman, Jez Webb, has made donations of £30,218 to both Tomlinson's and local Conservative Party funds since 2014. Webb stated that he donated in a personal capacity and that the very similar amounts "were coincidental." Tomlinson was subsequently accused of trying to remove references to previous links to Wonga from his website, including the arrangement of a sponsorship deal with Swindon Supermarine F.C. in 2011.

Tomlinson voted for the UK to leave the European Union in the 2016 referendum.

In the House of Commons he sits on the Work and Pensions Committee. He has sat on the Public Accounts Committee and Consolidation Bills (Joint Committee).

Tomlinson employs his partner as Office Manager on a salary up to £40,000. The practice of MPs employing family members, has been criticised by some sections of the media on the lines that it promotes nepotism. Although MPs who were first elected in 2017 have been banned from employing family members, the restriction is not retrospective – meaning that Tomlinson's employment of his partner is lawful.

In September 2016, Tomlinson apologised for leaking a draft of a public accounts committee report on the credit industry to someone he knew who worked for payday lender Wonga. He was suspended from the House of Commons for two days for contempt of Parliament.

In November 2018, Tomlinson was criticised by Labour MP Ruth George after appearing to suggest that families facing a cap under the Universal Credit scheme could take in a lodger. A Department for Work and Pensions spokesperson later said that Tomlinson was giving "illustrative examples of how some households subject to the cap may have supplemented income" and denied that Tomlinson said households under the cap could or should consider taking a lodger. Tomlinson was Parliamentary Under-Secretary (junior government minister) for Family Support, Housing and Child Maintenance within the Department for Work and Pensions (DWP).

Tomlinson left government during the cabinet reshuffle on 16 September 2021 and returned to the backbenches.

Tomlinson was appointed Deputy Chair of the Conservative Party on 16 September 2021. He resigned from this position on 9 July 2022 in order to support Kemi Badenoch's campaign in the July 2022 Conservative Party leadership election.

In February 2022 Tomlinson was accused of bullying and sending inappropriate "unprofessional" and "belittling" messages to employees at Conservative Campaign Headquarters.

Personal life
Tomlinson announced his engagement to Jo Wheeler in August 2011, having proposed on The Peak, the highest point on Hong Kong Island. The couple married at the House of Commons on 2 June 2012. In July 2016, Tomlinson confirmed that he had divorced his wife and was in a relationship with his office manager, Kate Bennett. They married in October 2018 and have one daughter, born in August 2019.

Notes

References

External links
Official website

1976 births
Living people
Conservative Party (UK) MPs for English constituencies
Councillors in Wiltshire
UK MPs 2010–2015
UK MPs 2015–2017
UK MPs 2017–2019
Alumni of Oxford Brookes University
UK MPs 2019–present